Campanella is a genus of fungi in the family Marasmiaceae. The genus has a widespread distribution, especially in tropical regions, and contains about 40 species.

Species
C. aberrans
C. aeruginea
C. africana
C. boninensis
C. buettneri
C. caesia
C. cucullata
C. eberhardtii
C. fimbriata
C. gigantospora
C. gregaria
C. junghuhnii
C. inquilina
C. inquilina
C. pendulosa
C. purpureobrunnea
C. tristis
C. vinosolivida

See also

List of Marasmiaceae genera

References

External links

Marasmiaceae
Agaricales genera
Taxa named by Paul Christoph Hennings